The 2019–20 St. Cloud State Huskies men's ice hockey season was the 85th season of play for the program, the 23rd at the Division I level and the 7th in the NCHC conference. The Huskies represented St. Cloud State University and were coached by Brett Larson, in his 2nd season.

On March 12, 2020, NCHC announced that the tournament was cancelled due to the coronavirus pandemic, before any games were played.

Roster
As of September 8, 2019.

Standings

Schedule and Results

|-
!colspan=12 style=";" | Exhibition

|-
!colspan=12 style=";" | Regular Season

|- 
!colspan=12 style=";" | 

|-
!colspan=12 style=";" | 
|- align="center" bgcolor="#e0e0e0"
|colspan=12|Tournament Cancelled

Scoring Statistics

Goaltending statistics

Rankings

Players drafted into the NHL

2020 NHL Entry Draft

† incoming freshman

References

St. Cloud State Huskies men's ice hockey seasons
St. Cloud State Huskies
St. Cloud State Huskies
St. Cloud State Huskies
St. Cloud State Huskies